Cathryn Mary Lee Harrison (25 May 1959 – 1 October 2018) was an English actress.

Early life 
Harrison was the daughter of the actor and singer Noel Harrison and Sara Lee Eberts and the granddaughter of actor Sir Rex Harrison.

Career 
Harrison began her career with Robert Altman's film Images in 1972. Her later performances included the role of Lily in Black Moon (1975), Louis Malle's first film in English, as well as many television programmes including Portrait of a Marriage (1990) in which she played Violet Trefusis, Vita Sackville West's lesbian lover.

She worked in British television and radio dramas, appearing in Love on a Branch Line; a 1989 episode of Hannay, opposite Robert Powell; and a 1977 Australian film called Blue Fire Lady. She also appeared as Major Tom Cadman's wife in the ITV series Soldier Soldier, and played assistant stage manager Irene in the film version of Ronald Harwood's The Dresser.

Films and television 

 Images (1972) - Susannah
 The Pied Piper (1972) - Lisa
 Black Moon (1975) - Lily
 Romance (1977, TV Series) - Vere
 Blue Fire Lady (1977) - Jenny
 The Witches of Pendle (1977, TV Movie) - Alizon Device
 Moths (1977, TV Movie) - Vere
 Return of the Saint (1978, TV Series) - Sally
 Wuthering Heights (1978, TV Mini-Series) - Catherine Linton
 The Life and Adventures of Nicholas Nickleby (1982, TV Mini-Series) - Tilda Price / Henrietta Petowker
 Maybury (1983, TV Series) - Joanna
 The Dresser (1983) - Irene
 A Christmas Carol (1984, TV Movie) - Kate
 Robin of Sherwood (1986, TV Series) - Isadora
 The Happy Valley (1986, TV Movie) - Helen Tapsell
 Duet for One (1986) - Penny Smallwood
 Empire State (1987) - Marion
 Eat the Rich (1987) - Joanna
 A Handful of Dust (1988) - Milly
 Hannay (1989, TV Series) - Barbara Leigh
 Bergerac (1990, TV Series) - Julie Manton
 Chillers (1990)
 Portrait of a Marriage (1990, TV Mini-Series) - Violet Keppel Trefusis
 Soldier Soldier (1991, TV Series) - Laura Cadman
 Clarissa (1991, TV Series) - Mrs. Sinclair
 Agatha Christie's Poirot (1992) - Lady Horbury
 Desmond's (1993, TV Series) - Fiona
 Love on a Branch Line (1994, TV Mini-Series) - Chloe
 Thin Ice (1994) - Vandy
 Murder in Mind (1994, TV Movie) - Eileen
 The Choir (1995, TV Mini-Series) - Sally Ashworth
 Wycliffe (1995, TV Series) - Jane Hardy
 McCallum (1995, TV Series) - Claire Best
 Original Sin (1997, TV Mini-Series) - Claudia Etienne
 Déjà Vu (1997) - Fern's Masseuse
 Heat of the Sun (1998, TV Mini-Series) - Charlotte Elliott
 The Bill (1999, TV Series) - Ms. Spencer
 Table 12 (2001, TV Series) - Ali

References

External links 
 

1959 births
2018 deaths
20th-century British businesspeople
20th-century English actresses
21st-century British businesspeople
21st-century English actresses
Actresses from London
English film actresses
English television actresses
People from Marylebone